The miqat is a principal boundary at which Muslim pilgrims intending to perform the Ḥajj or ʿUmrah must enter the state of iḥrām (lit. 'prohibition'), a state of consecration in which certain permitted activities are made prohibited.

There are five mawāqīt. Four of these were defined by the Islamic prophet Muhammad. One was defined by the second Rashidun caliph, Umar ibn Al-Khattab, to fulfill the needs of pilgrims from the newly annexed regions in Mesopotamia.

List 
The mawāqīt are as follows:

If a pilgrim intends to perform an additional 'Umrah, then ihram must be assumed outside the boundary of the Haram area before re-entering Mecca to carry out the rites of 'Umrah. Many pilgrims choose to enter into the state of ihram at Masjid 'Aisha, which is the nearest and most convenient location from Al-Masjid Al-Haram. The condition to perform 'Umrah from this miqat is that one should be a resident of Mecca, and/or have entered into Mecca for more than 15 days. Transportation to get to this location is readily available near the mosque. Additional 'Umrah, if a person so intends, can also be done by assuming Ihram at any of the five main miqats.

Mīqāt Yalamlam is the assigned Miqat for all pilgrims coming from all regions located to the south of Mecca, particularly Yemen. Miqat Yalamlam is nowadays a small souq with a mosque in the Province of Mecca. Miqat Yalamlam is historically is the sole of Wadi Yalamlam. The current location is assigned by the Saudi government to be near the Red Sea coastal road (National Road No. 5), at a location called Saʿyā.

Scholarly opinion on entering ihram in the air 
Islamic scholarly opinion on how to enter ihram while flying in for the Hajj or Umrah slightly differs between ulama. Most interpret the hadith in Sahih Bukhari, Book 25, Hadith 14, which was narrated by 'Abdullah ibn 'Abbas, as meaning it is necessary to wear and assume ihram when leaving one's home. Others see wearing one's ihram before one's plane enters the miqat zone to be permissible too. A line drawn from the southernmost miqat at Yalamlam to the northwestern miqat at Juhfah puts Jeddah in the zone. Conventionally, pilots carrying pilgrims announce entering the miqat about 30 minutes prior, so that pilgrims can go to the lavatory and change.

Allah's Messenger (ﷺ) had fixed Dhul Hulaifa as the Miqat for the people of Medina; Al-Juhfa for the people of Sham; and Qarn Ul-Manazil for the people of Najd; and Yalamlam for the people of Yemen. So, these (above mentioned) are the Mawaqit for all those living at those places, and besides them for those who come through those places with the intention of performing Hajj and `Umra [sic] and whoever lives within these places should assume Ihram from his dwelling place, and similarly the people of Mecca can assume lhram from Mecca.

Al-Ḥaram 
The Ḥaram is the sacred precinct of Mecca within which certain acts are considered unlawful which may be lawful elsewhere. It is prohibited to hunt wild animals, damage any plant or tree, graze animals, carry weapons, fight, or behave in a manner that will violate the sanctity of Al-Masjid Al-Ḥarām. If a violation is carried out within the precinct of the Haram, an animal sacrifice or gift of charity (ṣadaqah) is required as expiation. The boundaries of the Haram are the following:

1.

2.

3.

4.

5.

6.

See also 
 Hejaz
 Holiest sites in Islam

References

External links 

Hajj
Hajj terminology